Graduation: Singles is the first compilation album from Japanese singer Nami Tamaki. It peaked at number six in the Oricon album charts and charted for ten weeks.

Track listing

References

External links
 Album Oricon profile 

Nami Tamaki albums
2006 albums